FX Movie Channel (FXM)  is an American pay television channel owned by FX Networks, LLC, a subsidiary of the Disney Entertainment division of The Walt Disney Company. It is the sister channel of FX and FXX. The channel's programming consists largely of movies, primarily those from the 20th Century Studios, Twentieth Century Pictures, and Fox Film Corporation library. Since 2013, FXM has separated its film content into two distinct blocks. Its main programming focuses more on recent films and its early-morning and daytime schedule (branded as "FXM Retro") focuses on classic films.

As of February 2015, FXM is available to approximately 52,607,000 pay television households (45.2% of households with television) in the United States.

History

fXM: Movies from Fox (1994–2000)
Originally intended to be titled "Fox Movie Studio" during the planning stages, the channel first launched at midnight on October 31, 1994 as fXM: Movies from Fox, a name derived from its sister cable channel FX, which debuted five months earlier on June 1. The first movie to air on fXM was the 1975 cult classic The Rocky Horror Picture Show. Its original format focused solely on classic movies from the 20th Century Fox film library, which were presented commercial-free and (in regard to films originally released in black-and-white) uncolorized, and were generally shown without editing for content and time; the films that were broadcast were mainly releases from the 1920s to the 1980s.

On February 7, 1997, FXM aired its first film production commissions of six under 12-minute films in a showcase hosted by producer-director Michael Apted. Two, Better Late (directed by Jessica Yu) and 78 (helmed by Noah Edelson), would initially premiere at the Sundance Film Festival.

Fox Movie Channel (2000–2014)
The channel officially changed its name to Fox Movie Channel on March 1, 2000.

On January 1, 2012, Fox Movie Channel's programming was divided into two 12-hour blocks: its main programming schedule, from 3:00 a.m. to 3:00 p.m. Eastern Time, was a commercial-free block retaining the older movies from the 20th Century Fox library. Another block, called FX Movie Channel, the other 12 hours consisted of an expanded slate of more recent feature films from Fox and some other film studios, including Columbia Pictures and Universal Pictures.

The channel, which ran only promos for its programming as well as interstitials relating to its films, also began running traditional advertisements during the 12-hour block, which runs from the late afternoon to the early overnight hours (from 3:00 p.m. to 3:00 a.m. Eastern Time). As a result, films broadcast on the FXM block are edited to allow for commercial time, and for content. Fox Movie Channel still retained uncut and commercial-free broadcasts of its films.

FXM: FX Movie Channel (2014–present)

On June 9, 2014, Fox Movie Channel changed its name back to FXM. On January 1, 2015, FXM broke format for its first and only time, running a marathon of the first season of the FX original series Fargo.

Since 2021, the channel now airs more family-friendly feature films from the Walt Disney Pictures film studio and its subsidiaries. This is in contrast to the purchase by Disney two years earlier.

High definition
FXM provides a high definition simulcast feed that broadcasts the channel's film content in 720p, the company's default transmission format.

References

External links
 official website
 official website
 website

English-language television stations in the United States
Movie
Disney television networks
Movie channels in the United States
Television channels and stations established in 1994
Television networks in the United States
1994 establishments in the United States